World in My Corner is a 1956 American film noir drama sport film directed by Jesse Hibbs and starring Audie Murphy and Barbara Rush. It was one of the few non-Westerns Murphy made in his career.

Plot
Tommy Shea (Audie Murphy), a boxer from Jersey City, is sponsored by millionaire Robert Mallinson (Jeff Morrow). He falls for Mallinson's daughter, Dorothy (Barbara Rush) who wants to break free from what she feels is her father's controlling ways and pursue her writing career.  In order to get hold of the kind of money it takes to start a life with Dorothy, Tommy decides to work for crooked fight promoter Harry Cram. This causes conflict with his honest manager, Dave Bernstein. As his big fight approaches, Tommy is torn about what to do.

Cast
 Audie Murphy as Tommy Shea
 Barbara Rush as Dorothy Mallinson
 Jeff Morrow as Robert T. Mallinson
 John McIntire as Dave Bernstein
 Tommy Rall as Ray Kacsmerek
 Howard St. John as Harry Cram
 Chico Vejar as Al Carelli
 Steve Ellis as TV announcer
 Art Aragon as fighter
 Dani Crayne as Doris
 Jimmy Lennon as Ring Announcer (as James F. Lennon)
 Cisco Andrade as Parker
 Harold 'Tommy' Hart as Stretch Caplow (as H. Tommy Hart, also acted as the film's technical adviser)
 Sheila Bromley as Mrs. Mallinson

Production
The film was Murphy's first following the tremendous box office success of To Hell and Back (1955) and used the same producer and director as that film. Murphy fights with several real life boxers on screen, including Chico Vejar, Art Aragon and Cisco Andrade. Andrade later praised Murphy as being "the first actor I ever saw who wasn't afraid of getting hit hard in a prize fight scene."

Response
According to Murphy's biographer, the film "didn't do anything at the box office".

References

External links
 
 

1956 films
1950s sports films
American boxing films
Audie Murphy
Films directed by Jesse Hibbs
Films with screenplays by Jack Sher
Universal Pictures films
1950s English-language films
1950s American films
American black-and-white films